Bastian Strietzel (born 19 June 1998) is a German footballer who plays as a centre-back for Carl Zeiss Jena.

Career
Strietzel made his professional debut for FSV Zwickau in the 3. Liga on 13 January 2021, coming on as a substitute in the 70th minute for Davy Frick against FC Ingolstadt. The home match finished as a 0–2 loss for Zwickau.

References

External links
 
 
 
 

1998 births
Living people
People from Markranstädt
Footballers from Saxony
German footballers
Association football central defenders
Borussia Mönchengladbach II players
Inter Leipzig players
ZFC Meuselwitz players
FSV Zwickau players
FC Carl Zeiss Jena players
3. Liga players
Regionalliga players